In the 2004–05 season, Trabzonspor finished in second place in the Süper Lig. In the Turkish Cup, the club was eliminated in the semi-finals by Galatasaray. The top scorer of the team was Fatih Tekke, who scored 34 goals.

This article shows statistics of the club's players and matches during the season.

Sponsor
Avea

Players
01 Michael Petkovic

05 Hüseyin Cimsir

06 Hasan Uçüncü

07 Miroslaw Szymkowiak

09 Fatih Tekke

10 Mehmet Hilmi Yilmaz

11 Ibrahim Yattara

13 Eul Yong Lee

14 Özgür Bayer

15 Augustine Ahinful

18 Tayfun Cora

22 Hasan Sönmez

24 Karel D'Haene

25 Ibrahim Ege

28 Tolga Seyhan

34 Emrah Eren

38 Erdinç Yavuz

47 Volkan Kürsat Bekiroglu

61 Gökdeniz Karadeniz

66 Adem Koçak

99 Celaleddin Koçak

Süper Lig

Turkish Cup

First round

|}

Second round

|}

Quarter-finals

|}

Semi-finals

|}

See also
2004–05 Süper Lig
2004–05 Turkish Cup

References

External links
League Table

Turkish football clubs 2004–05 season
Trabzonspor seasons